The Ulsan Expressway, is a freeway in South Korea, connecting Ulju-gun, Ulsan to Nam-gu, Ulsan.

Compositions

Lanes 
 Eonyang JC - Janggeom IC: 4
 Janggeom IC - Ulsan IC(Sinbok Rotary): 6

Length 
14.30 km

Speed limits
 100 km/h

List of facilities

IC: Interchange, JC: Junction, SA: Service Area, TG:Tollgate

See also
 Roads and expressways in South Korea
 Transportation in South Korea
 Donghae Expressway

External links
 MOLIT South Korean Government Transport Department

Expressways in South Korea
Transport in Ulsan
Roads in Ulsan